The Second Faymann government was a government of Austrian Chancellor Werner Faymann. It took office on 16 December 2013 following the 2013 legislative election, succeeding the First Faymann government. On 17 May 2016, it was succeeded by the Kern government, following Faymann's resignation amidst the 2016 presidential election.

In the 2013 legislative election the Social Democratic Party of Austria and the Austrian People's Party lost 5 seats and 4 seats, respectively, but with a total of 99 seats they remained in majority. On 14 October 2013 the two parties began government formation talks with each other, which resulted in the Second Faymann government that was appointed by President of Austria Heinz Fischer.

The government consists of 7 ministers from the Social Democratic Party of Austria, 6 ministers from the Austrian People's Party while 2 ministers are Independent. Minister for Foreign Affairs Sebastian Kurz is at the age of 27 the youngest person ever in Austria's history to become Federal Minister; he is also the youngest minister for foreign affairs in the European Union.

On 9 May 2016, shortly after the first round of the 2016 presidential election, Chancellor Faymann declared he would step down. Vice Chancellor Mitterlehner took over as interim chancellor.

Composition

References

External links 
 Federal Chancellery of Austria: Government

Politics of Austria
2013 establishments in Austria
Faymann II
2010s in Austria
2016 disestablishments in Austria